Live at the Olympia may refer to:

 Live at the Olympia (R.E.M. album), 2009
 Live at the Olympia (Damien Dempsey album), 2006